Ioannis Christophides (21 January 1924 – 9 December 2001) was a Cypriot politician who served as the Minister of Foreign Affairs of Cyprus from June 1972 to March 1978.

References

1924 births
2001 deaths
Politicians from Nicosia
Cyprus Ministers of Foreign Affairs
20th-century Cypriot lawyers